Avitta is a genus of moths of the family Noctuidae described by Francis Walker in 1858.

Description
Palpi sickle shaped, where the second joint reaching vertex of head. Third joint long and naked. Antennae long and ciliated in male. Thorax and abdomen smoothly scaled. Femur and tibia fringed with hair. Forewings with somewhat rounded apex. Hindwings with vein 5 from just above lower angle of cell.

Species
 Avitta alternans Warren 1903
 Avitta andamana Holloway 1984
 Avitta aroa (Bethune-Baker 1906)
 Avitta atripuncta Hampson 1926
 Avitta bracteola Holloway 1976
 Avitta bryonota Viette 1956
 Avitta ceromacra Berio 1956
 Avitta discipuncta Felder & Rogenhofer, 1874
 Avitta ekeikei (Bethune-Baker 1906)
 Avitta fasciosa Moore, 1882
 Avitta flavicilia Holloway 1976
 Avitta guttulosa (Swinhoe 1900)
 Avitta habrarcha Viette 1956
 Avitta inductalis (Snellen 1880)
 Avitta insignans Hampson 1902
 Avitta insignifica Hampson 1926
 Avitta ionomesa Hampson 1926
 Avitta lineosa (Saalmuller 1891)
 Avitta longicorpus Prout, 1922
 Avitta meeki Holloway 1984
 Avitta microsundana Holloway 1984
 Avitta novahibernia Holloway 198
 Avitta obscurata (Swinhoe 1897)
 Avitta ochromarginata Pagenstecher 1894
 Avitta ophiusalis Walker, [1859]
 Avitta pectinata Holloway 1979
 Avitta polyscia (Joicey & Talbot 1917)
 Avitta puncta Wileman, 1911
 Avitta quadrilinea Walker, [1863]
 Avitta rufifrons Moore, [1887]
 Avitta simplicior Gaede 1940
 Avitta subsignans Walker, 1858
 Avitta surrigens (Walker 1863)
 Avitta taiwana Wileman, 1915
 Avitta zopheropa Turner, 1909

References

 
 

Catocalinae
Moth genera